Skrova Lighthouse is a coastal lighthouse in Vågan Municipality in Nordland county, Norway.  It is located on a small skerry southwest of the island of Skrova which is in the Vestfjorden south of the island of Austvågøya.

History
Skrova Lighthouse was designed by Carl Wiig in 1920, and a team of carpenters from Volda was hired to build it. It was first established in 1922 and it was automated in 2005. It was listed as a protected site in 1999. The 2,298,000-candela

See also

Lighthouses in Norway
List of lighthouses in Norway

References

External links
 Norsk Fyrhistorisk Forening 
 

Lighthouses completed in 1922
Vågan
Lighthouses in Nordland
Listed lighthouses in Norway